A gene is a sequence of DNA or RNA that codes for a molecule that has a function.

Gene or Genes also may refer to:

Given name
 Gene (given name)
 Gene, a variation of Eugenia (given name)
 Gene Autry (1907–1998), American singer-songwriter, actor, businessman
 Gene Eugene, American singer, songwriter and producer Gene Andrusco (1961–2000)
 Gene Simmons, stage name of Gene Klein (born 1949), American musician and member of Kiss
 James Gene Tunney (1897-1978), Irish-American boxer and world heavyweight boxing champion
 Gene Vincent, American rock and roll and rockabilly singer and musician Vincent Eugene Craddock (1935–1971)
 Gene Wilder, stage name of American actor Jerome Silberman (1933–2016)

Arts and entertainment

Fictional characters
 Gene Belcher, on the television series Bob's Burgers
 Gene Forrester, in A Separate Peace
 Gene Hunt, on the British science fiction/police procedural drama series Life on Mars and its sequel, Ashes to Ashes
 Gene Marshall, a collectible fashion doll
 Gene, the main antagonist in Metal Gear Solid: Portable Ops
 Gene, the main character in God Hand
 Gene, the main character in The Emoji Movie
Gene Takavic, an alias used by the character Saul Goodman in the television series Better Call Saul

Music
 Gene (band), English indie/rock quartet who rose to prominence in the mid-1990s
 Genes (album) (2003) by Irish artist Dave Couse

Other arts and entertainment
 Genes (game show), Tamil language game show
 Gene (novel), a novel by Stel Pavlou

Other uses
 Gênes, historic department of the French Consulate and of the First French Empire in present-day Italy
 Gene (journal), established in 1976 and published by Elsevier
 Genes (journal), established in 2010 and published by MDPI

See also
 Gené (disambiguation)